Iofi Lalogafuafua is an American Samoan professional football manager.

Career
In 2011, he coached the American Samoa national football team.

References

External links
Profile at Soccerway.com

Year of birth missing (living people)
Living people
American soccer coaches
American Samoan football managers
American Samoa national football team managers
Place of birth missing (living people)